Phinehas is the eponymous debut EP by American metalcore band Phinehas. It was released on December 15, 2009, independently by the band. The EP was produced by the band themselves.

Promotion and release
The EP was self-released on December 15, 2009. A music video was produced for the song "Well If the Earths Are Stopped, Then the Fox Faces the Hounds" and was directed by Ricky Norris. "I Am the Lion" and "Grace Disguised by Darkness" were rerecorded for the band's debut Thegodmachine. The tracks "Well If the Earths Are Stopped, Then the Fox Faces the Hounds" and "Panhammer" were later re-recorded for the EP The Bridge Between.

Track listing

Personnel
 Sean McCulloch – lead vocals
 Glenn Gizzi – lead guitar, backing vocals
 Scott Whelan – rhythm guitar, backing vocals
 Ryan Estrada – bass
 Lee Humerian – drums, backing vocals

References

External links
 The Phinehas - EP on Last.fm

2009 debut EPs
Phinehas (band) albums
Self-released EPs